{{DISPLAYTITLE:C20H29NO3}}
The molecular formula C20H29NO3 (molar mass: 331.45 g/mol, exact mass: 331.2147 u) may refer to:

 ADDA (amino acid)
 Ditran (JB-329)
 EA-3167

Molecular formulas